Kali Ghata ("dark cloud") is a 1951 Hindi film directed by Kishore Sahu and starring Kishore Sahu, Bina Rai and Asha Mathur.

Cast
 Asha Mathur    
 Bina Rai    
 Kishore Sahu

Music
The music was scored by  Shankar Jaikishan . Lyrics were written by Hasrat Jaipuri and Shailendra

External links
 

1951 films
1950s Hindi-language films
Films directed by Kishore Sahu
Films scored by Shankar–Jaikishan
Indian black-and-white films
Indian romantic drama films
1951 romantic drama films